Oliver Lines (born 16 June 1995) is an English professional snooker player who practices at Northern Snooker Centre in Leeds. He is the son of professional snooker player Peter Lines.

Career

Amateur
Lines switched sports from football to snooker at aged 14. His progression continued by entering into the Players Tour Championship events in 2011, but made little impact in the 2011/2012 season. 2012/2013 saw major improvement and a notable 4–3 over Joe Perry in 2012 UKPTC 3. He also entered Q School for the first time in May 2013 in the hope of qualifying on the main but failed to do after securing four wins in the three events. Despite not qualifying for the main tour, Lines’ performances in Q School were enough to earn him a top up place in the qualifying round of the 2013 Australian Goldfields Open, his first senior ranking event. He won in the opening round, beating fellow Leeds-based player David Grace 5–4, but suffered a 5–4 reverse in the second round last-96 stage to Zhang Anda of China. For the rest of the season, Lines continued to enter PTC and amateur events, with his most notable result being a 4–2 over professional Scott Donaldson in the 2013 Ruhr Open.

Professional
In 2014, Lines won a place on the professional World Snooker Tour for the 2014–15 and 2015–16 seasons after beating Josh Boileau 6–1 in the final of the 2014 EBSA European Under-21 Snooker Championships.

2014/2015
His first match as a professional was a successful one, beating Dave Harold 5–4 in the qualifying stages of the Wuxi Classic, but he lost 5–1 to amateur Oliver Brown at the venue stage. He had a run to the last 16 stage of the opening Asian PTC event of the season in the Yixing Open, but failed to qualify for the Australian Goldfields Open and Shanghai Masters. In qualifying for the International Championship Lines beat world champion and world number one Mark Selby 6–4 from 4–0 down at the mid-session interval. He continued to impress at the Haining Open by reaching his first professional semi-final after dispatching Ryan Day 4–2 with breaks of 120 and 113. He then edged out Jimmy Robertson 4–3, but was whitewashed 4–0 in the final by Stuart Bingham. He came through a wildcard match at the International, but lost 6–3 to Rod Lawler in the first round. Lines’ Asian final helped him finish fifth on their Order of Merit to make his debut in the Grand Final, where he was eliminated 4–1 by Matthew Selt in the opening round. His first season as a professional concluded with a 10–7 defeat against Mark Davis in the second round of World Championship qualifying. He finished his first season as a professional ranked world number 78.

2015/2016
Lines signed up with Django Fung, who manages players such as Ronnie O'Sullivan and Judd Trump, and Lines hoped it would help him further his career.
A 4–2 win over Ali Carter saw Lines reach the last 16 of the Riga Open, but he lost 4–0 to Liang Wenbo. He qualified for the International Championship by beating Gary Wilson 6–3 and then won a match at a ranking event for the first time in his career by eliminating Noppon Saengkham 6–4, before losing by a reversal of this scoreline to David Gilbert. He made it through to the second round of the UK Championship with a 6–2 victory over Cao Yupeng, but was then whitewashed 6–0 by world number one Mark Selby. A second last 16 showing in the European Tour events came at the Gibraltar Open and was ended by Alfie Burden, but Lines finished 35th on the Order of Merit. He also got into the top 64 at the end of the season for the first time as he was ranked 61st in the world.

2016/2017
At the 2016 Indian Open, Lines reached the last 16 of a ranking event for the first time by beating Graeme Dott 4–1 and Andrew Higginson 4–2, but lost 4–2 to Shaun Murphy. After defeating Martin O'Donnell at the UK Championship, Lines knocked out world number three Judd Trump 6–2 and said it was the first time he had played well in a televised match. He reached the last 16 for the second time this season by dispatching Jimmy Robertson 6–0, but could not pick up a frame himself as Marco Fu won 6–0. After losing 4–0 in the third round of the Scottish Open, Lines lost five of his six matches in the remainder of the season.

Performance and rankings timeline

Career finals

Minor-ranking finals: 1

Amateur finals: 1 (1 title)

References

External links

Oliver Lines at worldsnooker.com

Snooker players from Leeds
1995 births
Living people